Marakwet East is an electoral constituency in Kenya. It is one of four constituencies of Elgeyo-Marakwet County.  Between 1992 and 2012, the constituency had eleven wards, all of which elected councillors for the defunct Marakwet County Council. However, after the promulgation of the new constitution, the constituency was subdivided into four wards: Embobut/Embolot, Endo, Kapyego, and Sambirir.

From 1963 to 1992, the constituency was known as Kerio North (not to be confused with Keiyo North, a constituency in the former Keiyo district). The name was changed to Kerio East in 1992. In 1997, the constituency was renamed Marakwet East.

Members of Parliament Since Independence

Wards (1992 - 2012) 
 Embobut
 Embolot
 Endo
 Kaptich
 Kapyego
 Kipkaner
 Koibirir
 Mokoro
 Mon
 Murkutwo
 Sambirir

References 

Constituencies in Rift Valley Province
1992 establishments in Kenya
Constituencies established in 1992
Constituencies in Elgeyo-Marakwet County